Manavalassery  is a village in Thrissur district in the state of Kerala, India.

Demographics
 India census, Manavalassery (Village) had a population of 6770 with 3203 males and 3567 females.

References

Villages in Mukundapuram Taluk